The women's long jump event at the 1988 World Junior Championships in Athletics was held in Sudbury, Ontario, Canada, at Laurentian University Stadium on 29 and 30 July.

Medalists

Results

Final
30 July

Qualifications
29 Jul

Group A

Group B

Participation
According to an unofficial count, 29 athletes from 22 countries participated in the event.

References

Long jump
Long jump at the World Athletics U20 Championships